Lucas Arnold Ker and Sebastián Prieto were the defending champions, but only Prieto tried to defend his title.
He partnered with Máximo González, but they were eliminated by Flavio Cipolla and Stefano Galvani already in the first round.
Daniele Bracciali and Lovro Zovko won the title, defeating Yves Allegro and James Cerretani 3–6, 6–2, [10–5] in the finals.

Seeds

Draw

Draw

References
 Doubles Draw

San Marino CEPU Open - Doubles
San Marino CEPU Open